Hymenocallis palmeri is a plant in the family Amaryllidaceae. Common name is Alligator-lily. It is endemic to Florida, found in cypress swamps, wet meadows, open pine woodlands and wet roadsides.

Hymenocallis palmeri produces egg-shaped bulbs up to 4 cm across. Leaves are bluish green, up to 65 cm long and 10 mm across. Umbels have only 1 or 2 flowers, if 2 then opening one at a time. Flowers are erect, funnel-shaped, white with a greenish eye in the center and teeth along the margins of the staminal corona. Seeds are green, egg-shaped, up to 20 mm in diameter.

References

palmeri
Endemic flora of Florida
Plants described in 1879
Flora without expected TNC conservation status